Crystallin, lambda 1 is a protein that in humans is encoded by the CRYL1 gene.

References

Further reading 

Genes
Human proteins